North Lakhimpur railway station is a main railway station in Lakhimpur district, Assam. Its code is NLP. It serves North Lakhimpur city. The station consists of three platforms. The platforms are not well sheltered. It lacks many facilities including water and sanitation. The station is considered as Gateway to Arunachal

Major trains 

 New Tinsukia - Tambaram Weekly Express
 Dibrugarh - Howrah Kamrup Express Via Rangapara North
 Kamakhya–Murkongselek Lachit Express
 Dekargaon–Murkongselek Passenger
 Murkeongselek–Rangiya Passenger

References

Railway stations in Lakhimpur district
Rangiya railway division
North Lakhimpur